Sidney Austin Riley (18 April 1878 – 31 March 1964) was a rugby union player who represented Australia.

 Riley, a centre, was born in Auckland, New Zealand, and claimed one international rugby cap for Australia, against New Zealand, at Sydney, on 15 August 1903. He also played rugby league in a match for New Zealand against Auckland and played for Auckland several times and was a member of the Ponsonby rugby club and Ponsonby United rugby league club.

References

Australian rugby union players
Australia international rugby union players
Auckland rugby league team players
Ponsonby Ponies players
1878 births
1964 deaths
Rugby union players from Auckland
Rugby union centres
New Zealand emigrants to Australia